Lunana is a remote village in Gasa District in northwestern Bhutan. It is the capital of Lunana Gewog which had a 2014 population of 810.

It is the setting for the film Lunana: A Yak in the Classroom.

Local people sell cattle and caterpillar fungus, and grow small amounts of wheat, buckwheat, potatoes, radishes, and turnips. Some spend winters in valleys at lower altitudes. Lunana gets  of preciptation per year.
The people maintain a traditional culture.

See also 
Lunanakha

References

External links 
Satellite map at Maplandia.com

Populated places in Bhutan